Parochmastis hilderi is a moth of the family Tineidae first described by Edward Newman in 1856. It is found in Australia and New Zealand.

References

Hapsiferinae
Moths described in 1956
Moths of New Zealand
Moths of Australia